A Mass rock (Irish: Carraig an Aifrinn) was a rock used as an altar in mid-17th century Ireland as a location for Catholic Mass. Isolated locations were sought to hold religious ceremonies, as observing the Catholic Mass was a matter of difficulty and danger at the time as a result of both Cromwell's campaign against the Irish, and the Penal Law of 1695. Bishops were banished and priests had to register to preach under the 1704 Registration Act. Priest hunters were employed to arrest unregistered priests and Presbyterian preachers under an Act of 1709.

Similar stones, known as Mass stones, are found in Scotland. While working in the 1880s as a hired farmhand for Robert Menzies of Tirinie, near Aberfeldy, Perthshire, South Uist seanchaidh Angus MacLellan learned that a Mass stone had stood in the middle of Mr. Menzies's farmfield since the days when Roman Catholic priests were outlawed in Scotland. A nearby high cross, Menzies added, marked the site of an important college of learning from the days of the Celtic Church. Mr. Menzies explained that, even though the local population had long since switched to Presbyterianism, former Catholic religious sites were still locally viewed with superstitious awe and were never tampered with. Menzies explained that the term for Mass stones, in the Perthshire dialect of the Scottish Gaelic language, was Clachan Ìobairt, meaning "Offering Stones."

Presbyterians held similar Conventicles and these were also outlawed, even though they were not religious ceremonies.

For Lutherans during the Counter-Reformation in Austria, a similar stone in Paternion was dubbed the hundskirche.

Use and records
In many instances in Ireland, a stone would be taken from a church ruin, and relocated to a rural area, with a simple cross carved on its top. Because the activity was illegal, the services were not scheduled and parishioners would be obliged to spread the word of them informally. By the late 17th century worship generally moved to thatched Mass houses. Some of the Mass rock places may have been used for patterns.

Partial data on Mass rocks is maintained by the Archaeological Survey of Ireland (for pre-1700 sites), and, to a lesser extent, the National Inventory of Architectural Heritage (for post-1700 sites).

Later use

In later years, the practice of open-air Masses was limited to rural areas and special occasions such as pattern days and Christmas. However, in the wake of the Coronavirus pandemic and the restrictions placed on indoor gatherings to address the COVID-19 pandemic in Ireland, Aid to the Church in Need (ACN) Ireland launched an initiative to celebrate Mass at some Mass Rocks.

See also 
 "Have you been at Carrick?" — folk song about attending a Mass rock service
 Mass rocks in Clontibret

References

 
History of Catholicism in Scotland
History of Catholicism in Ireland
Buildings and structures of the Catholic Church in Ireland
Penal Laws in Ireland